The 2021–22 season is Nakhon Ratchasima's 7th consecutive seasons in top flight after promoted back from Thai Division 1 in 2014. In this season, Nakhon Ratchasima participates in 3 competitions which consisted of the Thai League, FA Cup, and League Cup.

The season was supposed to start on 31 July 2021 and concluded on 21 May 2022.  Then, due to the situation of the COVID-19 pandemic is still severe, FA Thailand decided to postpone the season to start on 13 August 2021 instead. However, as it stands on 23 July 2021, the COVID-19's situation is getting even worse. Therefore, FA Thailand decided to postpone the opening day for the second time to start on 3 September 2021.

Squad

Transfer

Pre-season transfer

In

Loan In

Out

Loan Out

Mid-season transfer

In

Loan In

Out

Loan Out

Competitions

Overview

Thai League 1

League table

Results summary

Results by matchday

Matches

Thai FA Cup

Matches

Final

Thai League Cup

Matches

Team statistics

Appearances and goals

Overall summary

Season summary

Score overview

Notes

References 

NKR
Nakhon Ratchasima F.C.